Nuance was an American dance music/freestyle group. It was formed by the producer and arranger, Ron Dean Miller, and featured Vikki Love on vocals.  They charted three hits on the US Billboard Hot Dance Music/Club Play chart in the 1980s, including "Loveride," which hit #1 in 1985. The same track peaked at #59 in the UK Singles Chart in January 1985.

See also
List of number-one dance hits (United States)
List of artists who reached number one on the US Dance chart

References

American freestyle music groups
American dance music groups